The Senegalese Super Cup is a Senegalese football competition, held as a game between the reigning champions of the Senegalese Premier League (Ligue 1) and the Senegalese Cup, it challenged a winner of the Senegalese League Cup, it once had a winner of Nationale 1 from 2009 to 2015.  Up to 2015, it was known as the Senegal Assemblée Nationale Cup The first edition was held in 1978.

The 2017 edition will feature the first time Ligue 1 champion Génération Foot from Sangalkam, an area east of Dakar which has a fast growing population in the past two decades.

Winners

Performance by club
Listed titles only

See also
Senegalese Ligue 1
Senegalese Cup
Senegalese League Cup

Notes

References

External links
 Senegalese Cup and Super Cup Winners - rsssf.com

Football competitions in Senegal
National association football supercups